Serkan Çeliköz is a Turkish musician, songwriter, arranger, record producer and the original keyboard player for Turkish rock band Kargo. Towards the end of 2008, Serkan Çeliköz and Koray Candemir decided to end their involvement with Kargo due to vision and opinion differences with the other members. Together they formed their new band 'maSKott' and are currently living in Seattle while working on new projects between tour dates to promote their new album Tuval. In addition to his work with Kargo and maSKott, he is known for his ability to play many instruments and being a producer.

Career

Çeliköz began to show interest in music when he was a child, which prompted his family to enroll him at the Istanbul Universitesi Devlet Konservatuari (Istanbul University State Conservatory) at age 12.  He has been trained in classical music (Western art music) and learned to play piano, guitar, violin, bassoon and contrabass. By age 16 (1991), he began performing at music clubs with his initial band Mr. No. In 1994, he was invited to join Kargo as the keyboard player by Selim Ozturk and Mehmet Senol Sisli. During this time he played both at Kargo and Mr. No simultaneously. In 1995, Mr. No won the best group award given annually by RockHouse. In 1996, Kargo released their debut-album “Yarina Ne Kaldi?  (What Is Left For Tomorrow?) The album was an instant success, making Kargo the most popular rock band in Turkey. Later on that year Celikoz left Mr.No due to his heavy touring schedule with Kargo.

Kargo released their second album “Sevmek Zor” (Love Is Hard) in 1997. Çeliköz had a predominant role in this album as he composed most of the music, played and arranged all of the string instruments and keyboards. Also in 1997, Çeliköz began working with other artists as he did the keyboard and synthesizer arrangements for Athena, Turkish Ska band. This was the start of his career as a record producer.

He released 3 more albums with Kargo during 1998–2000, Yalnizlik Mevsimi (Season of Loneliness), Sen Bir Meleksin (You are an angel) and Best of Kargo. After the best of album is released, Kargo decided to go their separate ways for a while to focus on their personal projects. During this time Çeliköz focused on his producer career. In 2000, Çeliköz with his bandmate Selim Ozturk take the lead in directing and guiding Asli, Turkish Rock Singer, through her first solo album “Neresindeyim”.  In addition to producing her debut album, Çeliköz played the keyboards, guitars and provided back vocals for “Neresindeyim”. His collaboration with Asli still continues to date as he has produced her second and third albums “Su Gibi” in 2004 and “Dans Etmeye Ihtiyacim Var” in 2007.

In 2001, Çeliköz returned working with his initial rock band Mr.No, this time as a record producer. During 2002 he worked with Teoman, a widely popular Turkish acoustic rock singer and songwriter, on two projects as an arranger.

After a three-year hiatus, Kargo regrouped in 2003 to begin work on their next studio album. Their 2004 release “Ates ve Su” (Fire and Water) was welcomed by the fans with great interest. In 2004, Çeliköz also played keyboards in debut album of Yalın, Turkish pop singer. Yalın’s album “Ellerine Saglik” sold 200,000 copies within first week and reached 500,000 copies at the end of 4 months. In 2006, Çeliköz produced Yalın’s second album “Bir Bakmissin” which received favorable critiques and high sales numbers.  Çeliköz and Selim Ozturk, co-producer of Yalin’s albums, are credited with producing highest selling records for Yalın.

In 2007, Çeliköz released “Yildizlarin Altinda” (Under the Stars) with Kargo. This album consisted of covers of Turkish rock and pop songs and became instant success. With the success of “Yildizlarin Altinda” Kargo toured Turkey, giving more than 100 concerts which made them earn the second position in number of concerts given by a Turkish Rock Artist.

Çeliköz has recently finished working on debut solo album for Cenkhan, Turkish Rock Singer, as a producer and arranger for keyboards and synthesizer. “Gulmeyi Dene” is planned to be released in May 2008.

Other work

In addition to mainstream musical career Çeliköz also had smaller side projects in terms of music for commercials and remixes. 
He started writing music for commercials first for Kargo’s 2000 commercial for Efes Dark, a product of Efes Beverage Group. Later on he formed JinglePeople with Mert Koral. JinglePeople produced commercial music for several big Turkish firms such as Turkcell (a version for Turkcell Power), leading mobile phone operator, and Arcelik (a version development for kitchen households), major household appliances manufacturer. Most recent commercial work of Çeliköz, as a member of JinglePeople is for Jacobs Coffee released in 2008. In addition to composing the music for commercial Çeliköz also played in the commercial with the rest of Kargo.

His interest for electronic music, prompted Çeliköz to venture out to doing remixes for Turkish artists. He provided remixes for Teoman, Yalın as well as his band Kargo.

Discography

With Kargo
See Kargo Discography

Sources
 Serkan Çeliköz Official Site
 Kargo Online Official site

External links
Serkan Çeliköz Official Site in Turkish, English
maSKott Official Site in Turkish, English
Kargo Official Site in Turkish, English, French and other languages
Jingle People Site in Turkish

Living people
Turkish songwriters
Turkish record producers
Turkish keyboardists
Year of birth missing (living people)